Maxwell Ward (3 February 1907 – 24 October 1983) was an Australian cricketer. He played two first-class matches for New South Wales in 1936/37.

See also
 List of New South Wales representative cricketers

References

External links
 

1907 births
1983 deaths
Australian cricketers
New South Wales cricketers
Cricketers from Sydney